Monash University, Clayton campus is the main campus of Monash University located in Clayton, which is a suburb of Melbourne, Australia, in the state of  Victoria.

The campus covers an area of over 1.1 km² and is the largest of the Monash University campuses, both in terms of size and student population. As of 2017, the Clayton Campus had over 41,000 students.

The campus has its own suburb and is one of the few university campuses in Australia to have its own postcode (3800), and shares the telephone number extension of 990 with the other city campuses of the university. The Campus features a wide range of native Australian flora and fauna, including over 2000 different kinds of plant life.

Location
The campus is located in the south-east Melbourne suburb of Clayton. It contains the greatest density of high technology industries in Victoria.

The campus is accessible via several suburban bus routes, including the 630, 631, 703, 733, 737, 742, 802, 804, 862 and the Smartbus 900 routes. It is also accessible via the route 601 shuttle bus service which operates to commute solely between the campus and the nearby Huntingdale station. The university also operates inter-campus shuttle buses to its Caulfield and Peninsula campuses.

In 2018, Victorian premier Daniel Andrews announced that a new tram line would be constructed between Caulfield station and Rowville via Dandenong Road and Wellington Road, which would connect the Caulfield campus to the Clayton campus.

As well as the Australian Synchrotron, the Clayton Campus is adjacent to the CSIRO. Bosch, Bayer, Agilent Technologies and several other science and technology companies are also located nearby. John Monash Science School is also located on the campus.

Facilities

Research
The Clayton Campus is home to large and sophisticated research facilities. The Australian Synchrotron, adjoining the campus, is one of the most recent and sophisticated of these. It is a 3 GeV synchrotron radiation facility that opened on 31 July 2007. It is capable of viewing matter at the molecular level using synchrotron light. Monash University contributed $5M towards the $206M cost of the synchrotron as a member of the funding partnership for the initial suite of beamlines.

The campus is also home to the Monash University Accident Research Centre, which includes an advanced driving simulator capable of simulating motor vehicle accidents. The campus also houses some of the world's largest regenerative medicine stem cell research facilities, including the Australian Stem Cell Centre, the Monash Immunology and Stem Cell Laboratories, the Monash Medical Research Institute and the Australian Regenerative Medicine Institute.

The Monash Antibody Technology Facility is also based at the Clayton Campus, which contains the largest monoclonal antibody production facility in the Southern Hemisphere. The largest wind tunnel in the Southern Hemisphere is another facility based on campus.

Many of these facilities are located in the Monash Science Technology Research and Innovation Precinct (STRIP), a major development which houses corporate and university science and technology enterprises.

Sport
The Clayton Campus has the most extensive sporting facilities of any Monash campus. These are used by the campus' many sporting clubs, as well as recreationally by staff and students.

Facilities at the campus include: five football and cricket ovals (including a pavilion), 12 tennis courts, eight squash courts, a hockey field and pavilion, an American football field, a baseball field and pavilion, 21 badminton and table tennis courts, a martial arts hall, a fencing cage, a boxing studio and ring, a 1500m sq. gym, an aerobics studio and two swimming pools.

Culture
Clayton Campus plays host to a range of cultural events throughout the year, including plays, musicals, concerts, exhibitions and conferences.

Notable facilities include the Robert Blackwood Hall (with a capacity of 1600 people), the Alexander Theatre (capacity of 508), the Student Theatre and the Monash University Museum of Art.

The campus has three major academic libraries: the Louis Matheson Library (for arts and commerce), the Hargrave-Andrew Library (for engineering, science and technology) and the Law Library. It is also home to numerous smaller academic libraries, as well as the Student Union Recreational Library (formerly John Medley Library).

Social life
The campus is home to numerous restaurants, cafés and retail outlets, largely located in the Campus Centre.

The Notting Hill Hotel, known among students as The Nott, is a large pub located adjacent to the campus and forms a major part of the social life for students on campus. It contains three bars, two beer gardens and two bistros. Now something of an institution, the Nott was founded in 1891 as a half way house for travellers, but boomed from the early 1960s after the establishment of Monash, expanding to cover an area of 0.8 hectares. It was owned and run by Australia's longest-serving publican, Kath Byer (known as the Reverend Mother by students) from 1936 until her death in 2010.

Monash Clayton also runs Host Scheme, the largest student-based orientation program in the Southern hemisphere. It has been in existence since 1974, and includes orientation camps, tours, BBQs, functions, festivals, and massive party called Host Scheme Night, which is run on the Monday night of O-week every year.

The Clayton Campus is also a short trip from Chadstone Shopping Centre, the largest shopping mall in the Southern Hemisphere.

Residential services

Monash Residential Services is home to over 3000 students and staff. There are twelve residential halls on campus,  Deakin Hall, Farrer Hall, Howitt Hall, Normanby House, Richardson Hall, Roberts Hall, Briggs Hall, Jackomos Hall, Campbell Hall, Holman Hall, Logan Hall and Turner Hall, along with the South East Flats.

The Clayton Campus is also affiliated with Mannix College (adjacent to the university).

Faculties at the Clayton campus
Although many faculties have a presence on multiple campuses, the majority are based at Clayton. The following faculties are based at Clayton Campus:

Arts
Business & Economics
Education
Engineering
Information Technology
Law
Medicine, Nursing & Health Sciences
Science

Shootings
In 2002, Huan Xing Yiang, an international student, shot dead two students and wounded several lecturers and students. He also stabbed a doctor after he was jailed in correctional hospital.

See also
 Radio Monash
 Monash College

References

External links
Campus website

Clayton
Landmarks in Melbourne
Buildings and structures in the City of Monash